Shaune Bagwell (née Shaune Stauffer) is an American born fashion model, beauty queen, style influencer and actress.  She has modeled for various fashion designers including, Gucci, Victoria's Secret, Christian Lacroix, Negris Lebrum, Isaac Mizrahi, Calvin Klein, Richard Tyler, and Guess. She walked in New York Fashion Week for Negris Lebrum’s spring-summer 2022 and 2023 collections.

In July 2012, Bagwell represented Texas at the Galaxy International Pageant in Orlando, Florida; in 2013, she was crowned Ms. United States Galaxy.  Bagwell also represented Texas in the 2018 Ms. United States Pageant placing in the top 10. 

Bagwell is also an actress who appeared in several films and the popular television soap opera, Days of Our Lives, The Extreme Gong Show, Single in LA, and Trampoline Girl on the Man's Showl..

Filmography

External links

1966 births
Living people
Actresses from Houston
American cheerleaders
Female models from Texas
National Football League cheerleaders
21st-century American women